Viktor Városi (born 21 October 1993) is a Hungarian football player who currently plays for Kozármisleny SE.

Club statistics

Updated to games played as of 26 October 2014.

External links
 HLSZ.hu 
  
 

1993 births
Living people
Sportspeople from Pécs
Hungarian footballers
Association football midfielders
Pécsi MFC players
Kozármisleny SE footballers
Szombathelyi Haladás footballers
Nemzeti Bajnokság I players
Hungarian expatriate footballers
Expatriate footballers in Austria
Hungarian expatriate sportspeople in Austria